Steven Patrick Garvey (born December 22, 1948) is an American former professional baseball player. He played in Major League Baseball as a first baseman for the Los Angeles Dodgers and San Diego Padres from 1969 to 1987.

Garvey was the National League (NL) Most Valuable Player in 1974 and National League Championship Series MVP in 1978 and 1984. He was an NL All-Star for 10 seasons and holds the NL record for consecutive games played (1,207).

The Padres retired Garvey's No. 6 in 1988.

Early life
Garvey was born in Tampa, Florida, to parents who had recently relocated from Long Island, New York. From 1956 to 1961, Garvey was a bat boy for the Brooklyn Dodgers, New York Yankees and Detroit Tigers during spring training. He graduated from George B. Chamberlain High School in 1966.

Michigan State University
After graduating from Chamberlain High School, Garvey played football and baseball at Michigan State University. He was committed to play football and baseball in college despite being drafted in the 3rd round by the Minnesota Twins in the June 1966 amateur draft at the age of 17.  Garvey credited Spartan head football coach Duffy Daugherty encouraging him to be a multi-sport athlete in his choosing MSU. He recorded 30 tackles and earned a letter as a defensive back in 1967. His first at-bat in a Spartan uniform resulted in a grand-slam home run, with the ball landing in the Red Cedar River. He was named Michigan State Baseball Distinguished Alumnus of the Year in 2009, he was inducted into the Michigan State University Hall of Fame in 2010, and his baseball jersey number 10 was retired from Michigan State University in 2014.

Major League Baseball career

Los Angeles Dodgers
Garvey was drafted by the Los Angeles Dodgers in the 1st round of the 1968 MLB draft (June secondary phase). He made his Major League debut on September 1, 1969 at the age of 20. He appeared in the 7th inning to pinch hit for Ray Lamb and struck out in his one appearance at the plate. He had two more plate appearances in 1969 as a pinch hitter and recorded his first hit on September 10, off Denny Lemaster of the Houston Astros. He played third base for the Dodgers in 1970 and hit his first home run on July 21, 1970, off Carl Morton of the Montreal Expos. He moved to first base in 1973 after the retirement of Wes Parker.

Garvey was part of one of the most enduring infields in baseball history, along with third baseman Ron Cey, shortstop Bill Russell, and second baseman Davey Lopes. The four infielders stayed together as the Dodgers' starters for eight and a half years, starting on June 13, 1973.

Garvey is one of only two players to have started an All-Star Game as a write-in vote, doing so in 1974. That year, he won the NL MVP award and had the first of six 200-hit seasons. In the 1978 National League Championship Series, which the Dodgers won over the Philadelphia Phillies, Garvey hit four home runs and added a triple for five extra base hits, both marks tying Bob Robertson's 1971 NLCS record and earning him the League Championship Series Most Valuable Player Award; Jeffrey Leonard would tie the NLCS home run record in the 1987 NLCS.

Garvey's cheerful personality, his availability with reporters, and his willingness to sign autographs for fans made him a very popular player, and the Dodgers took advantage of this, making him one of the main focuses of their public relations campaigns. This caused friction with some of his Dodger teammates, such as Cey and Lopes, who thought Garvey was only acting this way to get endorsement opportunities. Cey, Lopes, and another unnamed player criticized Garvey in a mid-June 1976 San Bernardino Sun-Telegram article, which prompted manager Walter Alston to call a team meeting. At this meeting, Garvey said, "If anyone has anything to say about me, I want it said to my face, here and now." No one said anything. Tommy John thought it was at this point that Alston, who retired at the end of the year, began to lose control of the team.

Late in the 1978 season, the rift resurfaced when Don Sutton criticized Garvey for being the only Dodger to get publicity, insisting that Reggie Smith was a better player. The day after the article appeared, Garvey confronted Sutton with a copy of it in the locker room of Shea Stadium, where the Dodgers were for a series against the New York Mets. When Sutton affirmed that the quotes were his, the two got into a brawl. Garvey threw Sutton into Tommy John's locker, causing 96 baseballs John had been signing to fall out. Neither was hurt, though, and the two managed to overcome their feud, making sure they were the first to congratulate each other on the field for the rest of the year.

With the Dodgers, Garvey played in 1,727 games over 14 seasons and hit .301 with 211 homers and 992 RBI. He was selected to eight All-Star Games and won the All-Star Game MVP Award for the 1974 and 1978 games. He also won four straight Gold Glove Awards from 1974 to 1977, won the 1981 Roberto Clemente Award, and finished in the top 10 in the NL MVP Award voting five times.

After Garvey signed with the San Diego Padres in 1982, the Dodgers kept his number 6 out of circulation for 21 years until it was given to utility player Jolbert Cabrera in 2003. It is Dodger policy not to officially retire a number unless a player who spent a majority of his playing days with the franchise gets inducted into the Hall of Fame.

San Diego Padres
In December 1982, Garvey signed with the Padres for $6.6 million over five years in what some felt was a "masterstroke" to General Manager Jack McKeon's effort to rebuild the team.  Though San Diego had vastly outbid the Dodgers, McKeon noted Garvey's value in providing a role model for younger players.  Additionally, Garvey's "box office appeal"—his impending departure from the Dodgers provoked some Girl Scouts to picket the stadium—helped San Diego increase its season ticket sales by 6,000 seats in Garvey's first year. Sports Illustrated ranked the signing as the 15th best free agent signing ever as of 2008.
 

His first season in San Diego allowed him to break the National League record for consecutive games played, a feat that landed him on the cover of Sports Illustrated as baseball's "Iron Man".  In an unusual homecoming, Garvey tied the record in his first appearance back at Dodger Stadium in Padre brown. For breaking the record, he was named the National League Player of the Week. The streak ended at 1207 consecutive games played (from September 3, 1975, to July 29, 1983) when he broke his thumb in a collision at home plate against the Atlanta Braves. It is the fourth-longest such streak in Major League Baseball history.

It was Garvey's second season in San Diego, however, that would be his highlight in a Padres uniform. In 1984, Garvey became the only first baseman in MLB history to commit no errors while playing 150 or more games. He handled 1,319 total chances (1,232 putouts and 87 assists) flawlessly in 159 games for the Padres.

Led by Garvey, winning his second National League Championship Series MVP award, the Padres won their first National League pennant over the Chicago Cubs in 1984. In Game 4, Tony Gwynn drew an intentional walk that Garvey converted into one of his four RBIs. After getting hits in the third, fifth, and seventh innings, Garvey capped off his efforts with a two-run walk-off home run off Lee Smith in the ninth inning.  As he rounded third base, Garvey was met by fellow Padres who later carried him off the field in celebration.

The home run became popular among San Diego Padres fans and was captured in a sequence of three shots by Padres team photographer Martin Mann. He was the only photographer to get a sequence of shots of the swing, and went on to sell limited edition series photos of "The Home Run", along with appearances on local television. In an interview with The San Diego Union Tribune, Martin Mann said, “It was like nothing I’ve ever seen at a baseball game. It was just a magical night.  There was something about that night, I don't know what it was. It felt like something was going to happen.”

Garvey made his final appearance in a game on May 23, 1987, pinch-hitting for Lance McCullers in the ninth inning. He hit a flyout in his one appearance at the plate. In his 19-year MLB career, Garvey was a .294 hitter with 272 home runs and 1308 RBI in 2332 games played.

MLB statistics
Steve Garvey's major league stats:

Hall of Fame candidacy
In his 15 years (1993–2007) on the National Baseball Hall of Fame ballot of the Baseball Writers' Association of America (BBWAA), Garvey failed to reach the 75% required for induction.

In the December 2019 voting by the Modern Baseball Era's 16-member committee for the  Hall of Fame class, Garvey received six votes (37.5%). The Modern Baseball Era Committee votes next in December 2023.

Post-baseball career
In 1983, Garvey started Garvey Media Group while playing for the Padres. Its strength was in sports marketing and corporate branding. In 1988, he headed Garvey Communications, mainly involved in television production including infomercials. In addition, he did motivational speaking for corporations.

Since 1990, he has served as a member of the board of the Baseball Assistance Team, a non-profit organization dedicated to helping former major league, minor league, and negro league players through financial and medical hardships.

Garvey played himself on an episode of the NBC sitcom Just Shoot Me! in 1999.

Personal life and honors
Garvey is Irish American from his father's family. His father's roots come from County Cork, Ireland. At age 22, Garvey married Cynthia Truhan in 1971. They had two children, Krisha and Whitney. Cynthia was not very popular with most of Garvey's Dodger teammates or their wives, according to Tommy John. Cynthia left Garvey for composer Marvin Hamlisch; Garvey was already romantically involved with his secretary. Garvey and Cynthia divorced in 1983.

In July 1988, Garvey discovered that Cheryl Moulton was pregnant with his child, Ashleigh.  Despite this, Garvey proposed to Rebecka Mendenhall in November 1988, telling Mendenhall about Moulton at the time of the proposal. Mendenhall learned that she was pregnant that January. Garvey broke their engagement January 1, 1989, on a phone call. Garvey and Mendenhall had been in a relationship since 1986. Their only child, Slade, was born in October 1989.

In January 1989, Garvey became engaged to Candace Thomas, whom he met at a benefit for the Special Olympics. Over the next few weeks, Garvey and Thomas began a courtship that included trips to the inauguration of President George H. W. Bush and the Super Bowl.  Garvey, in the midst of what he termed a "midlife disaster", sued his ex-wife Cyndy for access to his two children. His daughters testified in court that they did not wish to see him. Under the shadow of multiple lawsuits, Garvey lost business opportunities and paid half his monthly television earnings in child support.

Garvey and Candace were married on February 18, 1989. They have three children together, Sean, Olivia and Ryan Garvey, and four from previous marriages, Taylor Abess, Shaunna Thomas Butler, Whitney Garvey, and Krisha Neither. Garvey resides in Los Angeles and Palm Desert, California.

On September 1, 2000, Garvey and his management company, Garvey Management Group, were charged by the Federal Trade Commission in the United States District Court for the Central District of California for false advertising related to a weight-loss product. In 2004, the United States Court of Appeals for the Ninth Circuit ruled that Garvey was not liable for the content of the infomercials as he was merely a spokesman. He had earned $1.1 million for appearing in the advertisements.

Honors
 Steve Garvey Junior High School (1978), in Lindsay, California, was named for him, but was eventually renamed as part of Reagan Elementary in 2011. 
 In 1981, Lawrence Ritter and Donald Honig included him in their book The 100 Greatest Baseball Players of All Time.
 Garvey's jersey No. 6, worn when he was both a Padre and Dodger, was retired by the Padres on April 16, 1988. 
 California Sports Hall of Fame (2009)
 Irish American Hall of Fame (2009). 
 Michigan State University Athletics Hall of Fame (2010).
He was selected to the initial class of "Legends of Dodger Baseball" in 2019.

See also

 List of Major League Baseball career hits leaders
 List of Major League Baseball career home run leaders
 List of Major League Baseball career runs batted in leaders
 List of Major League Baseball career runs scored leaders
 Major League Baseball consecutive games played streaks

References

External links

Steve Garvey at SABR

1948 births
Living people
American people of Irish descent
Major League Baseball first basemen
Los Angeles Dodgers players
San Diego Padres players
National League Most Valuable Player Award winners
National League Championship Series MVPs
Major League Baseball All-Star Game MVPs
National League All-Stars
Gold Glove Award winners
Major League Baseball players with retired numbers
Ogden Dodgers players
Albuquerque Dodgers players
Spokane Indians players
Michigan State Spartans baseball players
Michigan State Spartans football players
Major League Baseball broadcasters
Los Angeles Dodgers Legend Bureau
George D. Chamberlain High School alumni
Baseball players from Tampa, Florida